Cypriano Nunes, known as Castelhano, (22 September 1892 – 26 November 1980) was a Brazilian footballer. He played in four matches for the Brazil national football team in 1920. He was also part of Brazil's squad for the 1920 South American Championship.

References

External links
 

1892 births
1980 deaths
Brazilian footballers
Brazil international footballers
People from Santana do Livramento
Association football forwards
Santos FC players